George Manners may refer to:
George Manners, 11th Baron Ros (1470–1513), English nobleman
Sir George Manners (died 1623), English MP for Nottingham, 1588–1589, and Derbyshire, 1593–1596
George Manners, 7th Earl of Rutland (1580–1641), English landowner and politician, great-great-grandson of Baron de Ros
Lord George Manners-Sutton (1723–1783), born Lord George Manners, British nobleman and politician
George Manners (Scarborough MP) (c. 1746–1772), English MP for Scarborough, 1768–1772, nephew of the above
George Manners (editor) (1778–1853), writer and editor, British consul in Boston, Massachusetts, 1819–1839
George Phillips Manners (1789–1866), British architect
Lord George Manners (1820–1874), British nobleman and politician
George Manners (weightlifter) (born 1938), English weightlifter

See also
George Manners-Sutton (1751–1804), British politician, son of Lord George Manners-Sutton